Strákagöng is a tunnel in Iceland, located in Northwestern Region along Route 76. It is the second tunnel ever built in Iceland, only preceded by a minor tunnel of 30 meters between Ísafjörður and Súðavík. Prior to the tunnel being built, the only road connection to the town of Siglufjörður was a very difficult mountain road built in 1946, that was closed about 5 months a year due to snow.

References

Road tunnels in Iceland
Tunnels completed in 1967
Buildings and structures in Northwestern Region (Iceland)